A desktop traditionally refers to:
 The surface of a desk (often to distinguish office appliances that fit on a desk, such as photocopiers and printers, from larger equipment covering its own area on the floor)

Desktop may refer to various computer terms:
 Desktop computer, a personal computer designed to fit on a desk
 Desktop metaphor, a style of graphical user interface modeled after a physical work surface
Desktop environment, software that provides a comprehensive computer user interface
Remote desktop software, software that allows a personal computer's desktop environment to be run remotely on one system
 Client (computing), sometimes referred to as a desktop to distinguish a Client from the Server
 Desktop (word processor), a program for the ZX Spectrum

See also 
 
 
Laptop